BRP General Mariano Alvarez (PS-38) is the lone ship of its class of coastal patrol ships in service with the Philippine Navy. She was the lead ship of the US Navy's  prior to being transferred to the Philippine Navy.

History

Her small size, stealthy construction and high speed were tailored to performing long-range Special Operations Forces (SOF) insertion and extraction as well as other SOF support duties as needed.

As good a design as it is, Cyclone had barely gone into service in the mid-1990s when the Special Operations Command rejected them as too big for commando missions, and the regular surface Navy dismissed them as too small for any of its missions. The Navy began looking for ways to phase out Cyclone and her sister ships, so on 28 February 2000, Cyclone was decommissioned and stricken from the Navy list.

She was then transferred to the United States Coast Guard the next day, being re-commissioned as USCGC Cyclone (WPC-1). The Coast Guard lacked an effective vessel sized between its Island-class patrol boat and the Reliance-class Medium Endurance Cutter, so there was considerable interest in Cyclone at first. However, her high operating costs were prohibitive and thus she sat largely inactive.

Cyclone was eventually sold under FMS to the Philippine Navy in January 2004, as part of a US military aid package to the Philippines, in an effort to bolster interdiction and counterterrorism capabilities. She was rechristened BRP General Mariano Alvarez (PS-38) on 8 March 2004, in honor of a revolutionary general in the Philippine war of independence against Spain. She is currently assigned to the Patrol Force of the Philippine Fleet.

On 13 March 2013, while she was conducting maritime patrol together with  along the seawater off Omapoy Island and Bulo-Bulo Island, all of Sitangkai, Tawi-Tawi, they intercepted 2 watercraft loaded with 35 evacuees.

She was also one of the naval vessels that was deployed to Zamboanga City during the Zamboanga City crisis.

Technical details

Performance
The ship's operational capabilities were designed to meet the unique requirements of its Special Warfare missions. In high-speed, hard-over turns, the ship barely heeled as the automatic stabilizers engaged.

Weapons
Originally armed with two Mk38 25 mm chain guns fore and aft, several pintle mounts for attaching .50 caliber machine guns or Mk 19 grenade launchers, and a position for launching Stinger shoulder-fired SAMs (although this was removed when the ship was transferred to the Philippine Navy and is currently unavailable), the ship, along with others of her class still in the US Navy, were upgraded early on by replacing the after Mk.38 mount with the new Mk.96 platform. The Mk.96 combines both a M242 Bushmaster 25 mm chain gun and a 40 mm automatic grenade launcher on a single stabilized platform. The Mk.96 features an electro-optical fire control system with 27x zoom, infrared and low-light modes, a laser rangefinder, and an array of environmental sensors, which feed data into the ballistics computer to produce an accurate firing solution even while maneuvering at high speed. The computer can also interface with Stinger SAMs (which are currently unavailable). The US Navy was positive about the performance of the Mk.96 and briefly considered up-gunning the 25 mm Bushmaster cannon to a 30 mm or even 35 mm cannon, but due to the high price this never came to pass.

Sensors
The Sperry Vision 2100M combat system employs the navigational radars and the Sperry Voyage Management System integrated navigation and control system as a combat data suite. The radar intercept equipment was developed for use on helicopters. Has a Sperry Marine automated Integrated Bridge System (IBS).Each Mk 52 decoy rocket launcher carries 12 ready-service rounds, and 15 more rockets per launcher are carried in adjacent lockers. Ammunition supply includes 2,000 rounds 25-mm, 2,000 rounds .50 cal, 2,000 rounds 7.62-mm, and 1,000 40-mm grenades.

Navigation systems include Global Positioning System and Loran receivers. Radio gear includes LST-5C SATCOM/line-of-sight UHF transceiver, A5 Spectra VHF radio, ICM120 Marine Band radio, and RF 5000 HF, VRC-92A VHF, and VRC-83(V)2 VHF/UHF transceivers. AN/SAT-2A infrared signaling systems are fitted, and the Marconi Vistar stabilized FLIR sensor with integral low-light-level television camera is mounted on the mast. Have IFF transponder but no interrogation capability, although it may be added later. The sonar transducer is retracted within the hull at speeds above 14 kn.

Structure
The hull was constructed using BS-4360 Grade 43A steel, the superstructure was constructed using 5086 aluminum alloy. Main propulsion is generated by four Paxman Valenta 16CM-16RP200M diesels, developing 3,350 bhp, driving 12.8 cm six-blade highly skewed, variable pitch and rake, NI-AL bronze MIL-B24480A, alloy 1 amendment 3 (nickel-aluminum-bronze alloy) propellers, with pitch ratio of 1.465 at 0.7 radius and designed by USN NSWCCD (Code 544 drawing number P-5237B). Four Reintjes WVS-2232 reduction gearbox, with a reduction ratio: 2.025:1. Fuel capacity is 47,772 liters (12,620 gallons). Oil capacity is 568 liters (150 gallons). Total air conditioning plants production, 83.33 kW. They can refuel at sea, using astern fueling rigs. Ship can survive up to Sea State 5. Maximum ship endurance at 10 days. Electricity supplied by two Caterpillar Model 3306 DIT Series B, rating 150 kW @ 1,800 rpm. Reverse osmosis desalinators, having a 1,514 liters (400 gallons) capacity per day. Fresh water capacity is 4,701 liters (1,242 gallons).
Equipped with Vosper fin stabilization system and a stern wedge to improve trim at high speeds. Kevlar armor is fitted to the command space.

Upgrades
Refitted by Bollinger Machine Shop and Shipyard prior to delivery and received a stern ramp modification upgrade known as the Combat Craft Retrieval System (CCRS) which had the ship's stern extended by nine feet to accommodate a deck ramp - which extends down to below the water line, for a 20 feet Rigid Hull Inflatable Boat (RHIB).

Operational history 
In April 2018, the BRP General Mariano Alvarez intercepted the Mongolian-registered M/V Diamond 8 after seeing some suspicious movement by the foreign vessel skippered by a Chinese national named Lin Yang Yin. Upon further investigation, approximately 27,180 sacks of Vietnam rice weighing 1,359 metric tons with an estimated market value of P67,950,000 was found on board the ship, along with 34 undocumented Filipinos, one of whom was a minor. General Mariano Alvarez subsequently escorted Diamond 8 to the Ensign Majini Pier in Zamboanga City. The crew of General Mariano Alvarez were eventually given the Bronze Cross Medal for this accomplishment on 12 May 2018.

In September 2018, General Mariano Alvarez participated in the Fifth Combined Maritime Security Activity in Zamboanga City, with the RAN which sent . The activity benefited both navies in terms of inter-operability training while complementing the maritime security operations of Western Mindanao Command by enhancing Naval presence and deterrence of movement of lawless elements at sea.

The activities of the exercise include a Capability Demonstration, Day Tours and Sports aimed at strengthening relations, enhancing mutual cooperation and interoperability of the three navies.

In early October 2021, the BRP General Mariano Alvarez took the place of the BRP Emilio Jacinto (PS-35) in the Island Province of Tawi-Tawi as the latter was set to undergo Repairs and Upgrade.

References

External links
 The Official Website of BRP General Mariano Alvarez (PS-38)
 Philippine Navy Official website
 Philippine Fleet Official Website
 Philippine Defense Forum
 Hazegray World Navies Today: Philippines
 Naming and Code Designation of PN Ships

Ships of the Philippine Navy
1992 ships
Ships built in Lockport, Louisiana